Tibetan names typically consist of two juxtaposed elements.

Family names are rare except among those of aristocratic ancestry and then come before the personal name (but diaspora Tibetans living in societies that expect a surname may adopt one). For example, in Ngapoi Ngawang Jigme, Ngapoi was his family name and Nga-Wang Jigmê his personal name.

Tibetan nomads (drokpa) also use clan names; in farming communities, they are now rare and may be replaced by household name.

Tibetan culture is patrilineal; descent is claimed from the four ancient clans that are said to have originally inhabited Ancient Tibet: Se, Rmu, Stong and Ldong. The ancient clan system of Tibet is called rus-ba (རུས་པ), meaning bone or bone lineage. The four clans were further divided into branches which are Dbra, Vgru, Ldong, Lga, Dbas and Brdav. With inter-clan marriages, the subclans were divided into many sub-branches.

While Tibetans from Kham and Amdo use their clan names as surnames, most farming communities in Central Tibet stopped using their clan names centuries ago and instead use household names.

Traditionally, personal names are bestowed upon a child by lamas, who often incorporate an element of their own name. In the Tibetan diaspora, Tibetans often turn to the Dalai Lama for names for their children. As a result, the exile community has an overwhelming population of boys and girls whose first name is "Tenzin", the personal first name of the 14th Dalai Lama.

Personal names are in most cases composed of readily understood Tibetan words. Most personal names may be given to either males or females. Only a few are specifically male or female.

Meanings of some of the common names are listed below:

Other common Tibetan names include Bhuti, Choedon, Choekyi, Chogden, Chokphel, Damchoe, Dasel, Dema, Dhondup, Dolkar, Gyurmey, Jampa, Jangchup, Jungney, Kalden, Khando, Karma, Kunchok, Kunga, Lekhshey, Lhakpa, Lhakyi, Lhami, Lhawang, Lobsang, Metok, Namdak, Namdol, Namgyal, Ngonga, Norbu, Paljor, Pasang, Peldun, Phuntsok, Phurpa, Rabgang, Rabgyal, Rabten, Rangdol, Rigsang, Rigzin, Samdup, Sangyal, Thinley, Tsomo, Tsundue, Wangchuk, Wangyag, Woeser, Woeten, Yangdol, Yangkey, and Yonten, Sajan Lama Ngarden.

References

External links
 Archived version of article at www.tibetanworldmagazine.com

Names by culture